Andrés Montiel, is a Mexican actor born in Guadalajara, Jalisco.

He started acting professionally at age 19, and soon developed solid theatre experience appearing in several plays and notable productions of Hamlet and The Lonesome West. Since year 2001, he began to act in films. He can be seen opposite Gael García Bernal as journalist Ruben in the Academy Award and Golden Globe Award Nominated El crimen del Padre Amaro (The Crime of Father Amaro) and in many other films such as the critically acclaimed Más que a nada en el mundo (More than Anything in the World) and  La Zona (2007) (The Zone), awarded the International Critics' Award (FIPRESCI) at the Toronto International Film Festival.

Other recent film participations include Ciudadano Buelna by acclaimed filmmaker Felipe Cazals; the epic Cinco de Mayo: The Battle and Cantinflas.

On television, he can be seen on Netflix original series first Spanish production Club de Cuervos, La querida del Centauro for Telemundo, and the
mexican hit series Infames

Filmography

Film

Television

External links
 

Mexican male actors
Living people
Male actors from Guadalajara, Jalisco
Year of birth missing (living people)